The 2016 ITTF World Tour Grand Finals was the final competition of the 2016 ITTF World Tour, the International Table Tennis Federation's professional table tennis world tour. It was the 21st edition of the competition, and was held from 8–11 December 2016 in Doha, Qatar.

The competition featured events in six categories: men's and women's singles, men's and women's doubles, and under-21 men's and women's singles.

Events

Qualification

Individual players and doubles pairs earned points based on their performances in the 20 events of the 2016 ITTF World Tour. The top 16 men's and women's singles players, the top eight men's and women's doubles pairs and the top eight under-21 men's and women's players who satisfied the qualification criteria were invited to compete. The seedings for the tournament draws were based on final tour standings, not the official ITTF world ranking.

Withdrawals

China's Liu Shiwen and Singapore's Yu Mengyu were not included on the list of confirmed players published on 25 November for the women's singles tournament, despite having finished in qualifying positions in the tour standings. It was later reported on 28 November that Liu Shiwen has been suspended from international competition by the Chinese team. On 1 December, China's Zhang Jike was forced to withdraw from the men's singles tournament because of a foot injury.

After winning her first round match, defending champion Ding Ning was forced to withdraw from the women's singles tournament due to illness.

Men's singles

Players

Draw

Women's singles

Players

Draw

Men's doubles

Players

Draw

Women's doubles

Players

Draw

See also

2016 World Team Table Tennis Championships
Table tennis at the 2016 Summer Olympics

References

External links
2016 ITTF World Tour Grand Finals
International Table Tennis Federation

2016
2016 in table tennis
Table tennis competitions in Qatar
International sports competitions hosted by Qatar
Sports competitions in Doha
ITTF